Roger Till (born 4 September 1947) is a British wrestler. He competed in the men's freestyle 70 kg at the 1968 Summer Olympics.

References

External links
 

1947 births
Living people
British male sport wrestlers
Olympic wrestlers of Great Britain
Wrestlers at the 1968 Summer Olympics
Sportspeople from London